Trithioacetone (2,2,4,4,6,6-hexamethyl-1,3,5-trithiane) is an organic chemical with formula . It can be viewed as a derivative of 1,3,5-trithiane, with methyl-group substituents for all of the hydrogen atoms in that parent structure.

The compound Trithioacetone is a stable cyclic trimer of thioacetone (propane-2-thione), which by itself is an unstable compound. In contrast, the analogous trioxane compound, 2,2,4,4,6,6-hexamethyl-1,3,5-trioxane (Triacetone), with oxygen atoms in place of the sulfur atoms, seems to be unstable, while its corresponding monomer acetone (2-propanone) is stable.

Synthesis
Trithioacetone was first made in 1889 by Baumann and Fromm, by reaction of hydrogen sulfide with acetone. In the presence of an acidified  catalyst at 25 °C, one obtains a product that is 60–70% trithioacetone, 30–40% of 2,2-propanedithiol, and small amounts of two isomeric impurities, 3,3,5,5,6,6-hexamethyl 1,2,4-trithiane and 4-mercapto-2,2,4,6,6-pentamethyl-1,3-dithiane. The product can also be obtained by pyrolysis of allyl isopropyl sulfide.

Reactions
Pyrolysis of trithioacetone at 500–650 °C and 5–20 mm of Hg gives thioacetone, that can be collected by a cold trap at −78 °C.

Uses
Trithioacetone is found in some flavoring agents.  Its FEMA number is 3475.

Toxicity
The LD50 (oral) in mice is 2.4 g/kg.

See also
 2,4,6-trimethyl-1,3,5-trithiane
 Hexamethylcyclotrisiloxane, an analog with a silicon-oxygen ring instead of a carbon-sulfur one.
 Hexamethylcyclotrisilazane, with a silicon-nitrogen ring.
 2,2,4,4,6,6-hexamethyl-1,3,5-triselena-2,4,6-tristannacyclohexane, with a tin-selenium ring.

References

Sulfur heterocycles